Senator Ackley may refer to:

Edward Ackley (1887–1964), Wisconsin State Senate
Henry M. Ackley (1827–1912), Wisconsin State Senate